Pentazine is a hypothetical compound that consists of a six-membered aromatic ring containing five nitrogen atoms with the molecular formula CHN5.  The name pentazine is used in the nomenclature of derivatives of this compound.

Pentazine is predicted to be unstable and to decompose into hydrogen cyanide (HCN) and nitrogen (N2).

See also 
 6-membered rings with one nitrogen atom: pyridine
 6-membered rings with two nitrogen atoms: diazines
 6-membered rings with three nitrogen atoms: triazines
 6-membered rings with four nitrogen atoms: tetrazines
 6-membered rings with six nitrogen atoms: hexazine

References

Azines (heterocycles)
Hypothetical chemical compounds